The 2019–20 season was Atalanta Bergamasca Calcio's ninth consecutive season in Serie A, the top-flight of Italian football. The club competed in Serie A, the Coppa Italia, and, for the first time ever following their third-place finish the previous season, in the UEFA Champions League.

The season was coach Gian Piero Gasperini's fourth at the club, following the 4th, 7th, and 3rd-place finishes in the 2016–17, 2017–18, and 2018–19 seasons, respectively.

Following an agreement reached with both Milan clubs, Atalanta played their Champions League home matches at San Siro. Atalanta qualified for the champions League round of 16 for the first time in their history, and the first time a club has advanced to the round of 16 after losing its opening three matches. Amid the coronavirus pandemic in Italy, on March 25, the Associated Press dubbed the Champions League match between Atalanta and Spanish club Valencia at the San Siro in Milan on 19 February as "Game Zero". The match was the first leg of the round of 16, and had an attendance of over 40,000 people—about one third of Bergamo's population. By March 24, almost 7,000 people in the province of Bergamo had tested positive for COVID-19, and more than 1,000 people had died from the virus, making Bergamo the hardest-hit province in all of Italy during the pandemic.

With Iličić, Muriel, and Zapata all scoring over 15 league goals, they became the first club to have three players strike at least 15 times in Serie A since Juventus achieved the feat 70 years prior in 1951–52. On 21 July 2020, Atalanta reached 95 goals in Serie A, the highest by any side in a single season for more than 60 years. Atalanta would end up finishing the season with 98 goals in Serie A.

Players

Squad information
Last updated on 1 March 2020
Appearances include league matches only

Transfers

In

Loans in

Out

Loans out

Pre-season and friendlies

Competitions

Overview

Serie A

League table

Results summary

Results by round

Matches

Coppa Italia

UEFA Champions League

Group stage

Knockout phase

Round of 16

Quarter-finals

Statistics

Appearances and goals

|-
! colspan=14 style=background:#DCDCDC; text-align:center| Goalkeepers

|-
! colspan=14 style=background:#DCDCDC; text-align:center| Defenders

|-
! colspan=14 style=background:#DCDCDC; text-align:center| Midfielders

|-
! colspan=14 style=background:#DCDCDC; text-align:center| Forwards

|-
! colspan=14 style=background:#DCDCDC; text-align:center| Players transferred out during the season

Goalscorers

Last updated: 12 August 2020

Clean sheets

Last updated: 1 March 2020

Disciplinary record

Last updated: 1 March 2020

References

Atalanta B.C. seasons
Atalanta
Atalanta